Lovro Bizjak (born 12 November 1993) is a Slovenian footballer who plays as a forward for Slovenian PrvaLiga club Celje.

Club career
On 14 August 2018, Bizjak signed a four-year contract with the Russian Premier League club Ufa. Twelve days earlier he scored against Ufa for his previous club Domžale in the UEFA Europa League qualifying game, where Ufa advanced to the next round due to away goals rule.

He made his Russian Premier League debut for Ufa on 20 August 2018 in a game against Dynamo Moscow. On 15 January 2021, his contract with Ufa was terminated by mutual consent.

On 29 January 2021, he joined Sheriff Tiraspol.

References

External links
 
 Lovro Bizjak at oefb.at 

1993 births
Living people
Slovenian footballers
Slovenia international footballers
Association football forwards
NK Šmartno 1928 players
NK Aluminij players
NK Domžale players
FC Ufa players
FC Sheriff Tiraspol players
NK Celje players
Slovenian Second League players
Slovenian PrvaLiga players
Russian Premier League players
Moldovan Super Liga players
Slovenian expatriate footballers
Slovenian expatriate sportspeople in Austria
Slovenian expatriate sportspeople in Russia
Slovenian expatriate sportspeople in Moldova
Expatriate footballers in Austria
Expatriate footballers in Russia
Expatriate footballers in Moldova